Plasma oscillations, also known as Langmuir waves (after Irving Langmuir), are rapid oscillations of the electron density in conducting media such as plasmas or metals in the ultraviolet region. The oscillations can be described as an instability in the dielectric function of a free electron gas. The frequency only depends weakly on the wavelength of the oscillation. The quasiparticle resulting from the quantization of these oscillations is the plasmon.

Langmuir waves were discovered by American physicists Irving Langmuir and Lewi Tonks in the 1920s.  They are parallel in form to Jeans instability waves, which are caused by gravitational instabilities in a static medium.

Mechanism 

Consider an electrically neutral plasma in equilibrium, consisting of a gas of positively charged ions and negatively charged electrons. If one displaces by a tiny amount an electron or a group of electrons with respect to the ions, the Coulomb force pulls the electrons back, acting as a restoring force.

'Cold' electrons 

If the thermal motion of the electrons is ignored, it is possible to show that the charge density oscillates at the plasma frequency
  (SI units),
 (cgs units),

Note that the above formula is derived under the approximation that the ion mass is infinite. This is generally a good approximation, as the electrons are so much lighter than ions.

Proof using Maxwell equations. Assuming charge density oscillations  the continuity equation:

the Gauss law

and the conductivity

it remains:

which is always true only if

But this is also the dielectric constant (see Drude Model)

and the condition of transparency (i.e.  from a certain plasma frequency  and above), the same condition here  apply to make possible also the propagation of density waves in the charge density.

This expression must be modified in the case of electron-positron plasmas, often encountered in astrophysics. Since the frequency is independent of the wavelength, these oscillations have an infinite phase velocity and zero group velocity.

Note that, when , the plasma frequency, depends only on physical constants and electron density . The numeric expression for angular plasma frequency is

Metals are only transparent to light with a frequency higher than the metal's plasma frequency. For typical metals such as aluminium or silver,  is approximately 1023 cm−3, which brings the plasma frequency into the ultraviolet region. This is why most metals reflect visible light and appear shiny.

'Warm' electrons 

When the effects of the electron thermal speed  are taken into account, the electron pressure acts as a restoring force as well as the electric field and the oscillations propagate with frequency and wavenumber related by the longitudinal Langmuir wave:

called the Bohm–Gross dispersion relation. For such waves, however, the electron thermal speed is comparable to the phase velocity, i.e., 

so the plasma waves can accelerate electrons that are moving with speed nearly equal to the phase velocity of the wave. This process often leads to a form of collisionless damping, called Landau damping. Consequently, the large-k portion in the dispersion relation is difficult to observe and seldom of consequence.

In a bounded plasma, fringing electric fields can result in propagation of plasma oscillations, even when the electrons are cold.

In a metal or semiconductor, the effect of the ions' periodic potential must be taken into account. This is usually done by using the electrons' effective mass in place of m.

Plasma oscillations and the effect of the negative mass 

Plasma oscillations may give rise to the effect of the “negative mass”. The mechanical model giving rise to the negative effective mass effect is depicted in Figure 1. A core with mass  is connected internally through the spring with constant  to a shell with mass . The system is subjected to the external sinusoidal force . If we solve the equations of motion for the masses  and  and replace the entire system with a single effective mass  we obtain:

where . When the frequency  approaches  from above the effective mass  will be negative.

The negative effective mass (density) becomes also possible based on the electro-mechanical coupling exploiting plasma oscillations of a free electron gas (see Figure 2). The plasma oscillations are represented with the elastic spring , where  is the plasma frequency. Thus, the metallic particle vibrated with the external frequency ω is described by the effective mass

which is negative when the frequency  approaches  from above. Metamaterials exploiting the effect of the negative mass in the vicinity of the plasma frequency were reported.

See also 

 Electron wake
 List of plasma physics articles
 Plasmon
 Relativistic quantum chemistry
 Surface plasmon resonance
 Upper hybrid oscillation, in particular for a discussion of the modification to the mode at propagation angles oblique to the magnetic field
 Waves in plasmas

References

Further reading

Waves in plasmas
Plasma physics
Plasmonics